This is a list of episodes for Season 12 of Late Night with Conan O'Brien, which aired from August 31, 2004 to August 19, 2005.

Series overview

Season 12

References

Episodes (season 12)